Notable LGBT people from Seattle, in the U.S. state of Washington, include:

Faygele Ben-Miriam, activist
BenDeLaCreme, drag queen
Bosco, drag performer
Carrie Brownstein, musical artist, actor, and author
Brandi Carlile, musician
Abrahm DeVine, swimmer
Jenny Durkan, former United States Attorney; Mayor of Seattle since 2017 and the first female mayor since the 1920s
Michael Hadreas, musician
Rebecca Heineman, video game programmer
 Irene Dubois, drag performer
 Gretchen Kalonji – materials scientist, professor, and academic administrator
 Mama Tits, drag performer and entertainer
Mary Lambert, singer
Jinkx Monsoon, drag queen and singer
Waxie Moon, performer
Ed Murray, former Seattle mayor 2015 to 2017
Dylan Orr, government official
Clyde Petersen, filmmaker and musician
W. H. Pugmire, performer and writer
Megan Rapinoe, professional athlete
Dan Savage, writer and activist
Robbie Turner, drag queen

References

LGBT culture in Seattle
Lists of people from Washington (state)
Seattle-related lists
Lists of American LGBT people